Alan Thompson (born October 5, 1949) is a former American football running back in the Canadian Football League for the Ottawa Rough Riders. He also was a member of the Philadelphia Bell in the World Football League. He played college football at the University of Wisconsin.

Early years
Thompson attended James Madison High School, where he was a starter at running back. He accepted a football scholarship from the University of Wisconsin.

As a sophomore, he was named the starter at fullback. He had 220 rushing yards in his college debut against the University of Oklahoma. He led the team during the season, collecting 214 carries for 907 yards (fourth in the conference), a 4.2-yard average and 9 touchdowns.

As a junior, he was second on the team with 124	carries for 455 yards (3.7-yard avg.) and 5 touchdowns. As a senior, he was second on the team with 124 carries for 643 yards (5.2-yard avg.) and 6 touchdowns.

Professional career
Thompson was selected by the Dallas Cowboys in the 14th round (363rd overall) of the 1972 NFL Draft. On May 31, he instead opted to sign with the Ottawa Rough Riders of the Canadian Football League. He was a backup fullback, posting 18 carries for 94 yards (5.2-yard avg.).

In 1973, he signed with the Winnipeg Blue Bombers of the Canadian Football League. He was released on July 22.

In 1974, he signed with the Philadelphia Bell of the World Football League. He was a backup running back, registering 76 carries for 370 yards (4.9-yard avg.). In 1975, he tallied 20 carries for 68 yards (3.4-yard avg.), before the league folded mid-way through the season.

References

External links
Alan Thompson Stats

1949 births
Living people
Players of American football from Dallas
Players of Canadian football from Dallas
American football running backs
Wisconsin Badgers football players
Ottawa Rough Riders players
Philadelphia Bell players